Koufu (口父; Kǒufù) (died c.1126 BCE) was an ancient Chinese nobleman, a Zhou leader honoured by the Shang king Wǔ Yǐ.

Wǔ Yǐ rewarded Koufu with a city called Qiyi (岐邑).

Koufu died in the 21st year of the reign of Wǔ Yǐ.

Notes

12th-century BC Chinese monarchs
Shang dynasty politicians
Chinese nobility